Lac d'Isabe is a lake in Pyrénées, Pyrénées-Atlantiques, France. At an elevation of 1925 m, its surface area is 0.073 km².

Lac d'Isabe is in the commune of Laruns, in Ossau Valley.

Lakes of Pyrénées-Atlantiques